Dimitris Gizopoulos from the University of Athens, Athens, Greece was named Fellow of the Institute of Electrical and Electronics Engineers (IEEE) in 2013 for contributions to self-testing and on-line error detection of microprocessor architectures.

References

Fellow Members of the IEEE
Living people
Year of birth missing (living people)
Place of birth missing (living people)
Academic staff of the National and Kapodistrian University of Athens